Alex Puodziukas known by his stage name Al-P, is a Canadian musician, record producer and recording engineer, best known for being part of the electronic music duo MSTRKRFT along with Jesse F. Keeler. Al-P was producer for Black Cat 13, Death from Above's album You're a Woman, I'm a Machine and The Sick Lipstick's Sting Sting Sting.

Prior to forming MSTRKRFT, Al-P and Keeler collaborated in the late 1990s, then lived in different cities as Al-P moved to New York and worked at the studios Sound on Sound and Chung King, and did some recording for Jay-Z and Wyclef Jean. Al-P was later in the electronic pop group Girlsareshort, with friend Daniel Zabawa. They released two albums, Contactkiss in 2002 and Earlynorthamerican in 2003, before disbanding.

References

External links
 MSTRKRFT Official Website
 Girlsareshort on Upper Class Recordings

Canadian electronic musicians
Canadian record producers
Canadian people of Lithuanian descent
Living people
Year of birth missing (living people)